Seigenthaler is a surname that may refer to:

 John Seigenthaler (1927–2014), an American journalist, writer, and political figure
 Wikipedia Seigenthaler biography incident, a hoax about the above
 John Seigenthaler (anchorman) (born 1955), an American news anchorman
 Joseph Seigenthaler (born 1959), an American sculptor and video artist